Ysgol Gyfun Gymraeg Glantaf (Taff Bank Welsh Language Comprehensive School) is a Welsh-medium coeducational secondary school in Llandaff North, a district in the north of Cardiff, Wales; it is the largest of its kind in the country. Of the three Welsh-medium secondary schools serving Cardiff, it was the first to be established; the others are Ysgol Gyfun Gymraeg Plasmawr and Ysgol Gyfun Gymraeg Bro Edern. Although all students speak Welsh and normally have received Welsh-language primary education, 68% (as of 2005) come from homes where Welsh is not the first language.

History
Ysgol Gyfun Gymraeg Glantaf was founded in 1978, initially sharing premises with the English-language Glantaf High School, before expanding to occupy the entire building. Its first headmaster was J E Malcolm Thomas, who was succeeded upon his retirement in 1995 by Huw S Thomas, and then by headmistress Rhiannon Lloyd from Rhydywaun School. In early 2010, the board of governors announced that from September 2010, the former head of Rhydywaun School would take over from Rhiannon Lloyd. From September 2010, Alun Davies was headmaster prior to Mathew Evans joining the school in September 2020 as headteacher from Ysgol Gymraeg Ystalyfera Bro Dur.

Pupil numbers at the school increased into four figures during the mid-1980s, necessitating the annexing of the buildings of the old Waterhall School in Fairwater to form the Ysgol Isaf (Lower School), which housed the first and second forms (later years 7 and 8) of the school from 1986. This split-site arrangement continued until the opening of Cardiff's second Welsh-medium comprehensive school, Ysgol Gyfun Gymraeg Plasmawr, in 1998, from which point the Llandaff North site again housed the entirety of Glantaf's pupils.

Welsh-medium education
Education in Wales differs in certain respects from the systems used elsewhere in the United Kingdom. Ysgol Gyfun Gymraeg Glantaf is a Welsh-medium school, which means that all lessons except English language and literature should take place in the Welsh language. The social use of Welsh is also highly encouraged, in order to ensure the pupils' fluency in the language. Ysgol Glantaf presents sixth form students for the Welsh Baccalaureate examination.

Ethos
The school colours are light and dark blue.

Houses
The school's four houses are named after Welsh saints: Dewi (house colour: yellow), Dyfrig (green), Illtud (red) and Teilo (blue). The four houses annually compete in the "Gŵyl Glantaf" (Glantaf Festival), in which there is a day of sports and a day of singing, playing instruments, reciting and numerous other events in the theme of the Eisteddfod.

Results
In 2008, 76% of pupils at GCSE (or equivalent) (ages 15 to 16) year achieved 5 or more A* - C grades at GCSE, and 76% of pupils at A/AS level (or equivalent) (ages 17 to 18) achieved two or more A - C grades.

Awards 
In 2019, Ysgol Gyfun Gymraeg Glantaf was named Welsh Secondary School of the year by the Sunday Times.

Notable alumni

Arts and media
 Gareth Bonello, musician
 Huw Bunford, musician, member of Super Furry Animals
 Siân Grigg, BAFTA winner and Oscar nominated Hollywood make up artist
 Ioan Gruffudd, actor
 Ffion Hague, broadcaster and author, wife of Lord William Hague
 Mali Harries, actress
 Gethin Jones, television presenter and former Blue Peter presenter
 Paul Carey Jones, opera singer
 Llwyd Owen, Welsh-language author
 Owen Powell, musician, former member of Catatonia
 Guto Pryce, musician, member of the Super Furry Animals
 Iwan Rheon, actor
 Matthew Rhys, actor
 Gwenno Saunders, musician
 Huw Stephens, radio presenter and DJ
 Jeremy Huw Williams, opera singer
 Rhodri Williams, sports journalist and television presenter
 Dyfed Wyn-Evans, opera singer
Sport
 Owain Doull, racing cyclist, member of the gold medal-winning team pursuit squad at the 2016 Summer Olympics
 Ioan Lloyd, Rugby Union, Bristol Bears & Wales u20
 Seb Davies, Rugby Union, Cardiff Blues & Wales
 Tom Isaacs, Rugby Union, Ospreys & Cardiff Blues, Rugby Sevens, Wales
 Darius Jokarzadeh, Olympic weightlifter, represented Wales at the 2014 Commonwealth Games.
 Manon Johnes, women's Rugby Union, Bristol Bears & Wales
 Max Llewellyn Rugby Union, Cardiff Blues & Wales u20
 Rhys Patchell, Rugby Union, Scarlets & Wales
 Jamie Roberts, Rugby Union player, Cardiff Blues & Wales
 Jamie Robinson, Rugby Union player, Cardiff Blues & Wales
 Nicky Robinson, Rugby Union player, Cardiff Blues & Wales
 Lee Thomas, Rugby Union player, Cardiff Blues

Politics
 Rhys ab Owen, Plaid Cymru Member of the Senedd 2021-
 Eluned Morgan, Labour Party Member of the Senedd 2015-, Welsh Government Minister for Health and Social Services.

See also
 Emyr Currie-Jones, Chairman of the Education Committee of Cardiff City Council, promoted the foundation of the school

References

External links
 Ysgol Gyfun Gymraeg Glantaf web site 
 2005 inspection report (.pdf)

Secondary schools in Cardiff
Welsh-language schools
Educational institutions established in 1978
1978 establishments in Wales